McLean Island may refer to:

 McLean Island (Nunavut), an island in Nunavut, Canada
 McLean Island (Saskatchewan), a village in Saskatchewan, Canada
 McLeans Island, a rural area near Christchurch, New Zealand

See also
 Maclean Island, an island in Tasmania